Bohannan Township is one of 21 inactive townships in Madison County, Arkansas, United States.  As of the 2010 census, its population was 631.

References

Townships in Madison County, Arkansas
Townships in Arkansas